is a town located in Miyoshi District, Tokushima Prefecture, Japan. , the town had an estimated population of 13,733 in 6281 households and a population density of 110 persons per km².

Geography 
Higashimiyoshi is located in northwestern part of Tokushima Prefecture on the island of Shikoku. It is situated on the north side of the middle reaches of the Yoshino River in mountainous region bordered by Kagawa Prefecture to the north. The Hashikura Prefectural Natural Park spans the border between Miyoshi and Higashimiyoshi.

Neighbouring municipalities 
Tokushima Prefecture
 Miyoshi
 Mima
 Tsurugi
Kagawa Prefecture
 Mitoyo
 Mannō

Climate
Higashimiyoshi has a Humid subtropical climate (Köppen Cfa) characterized by warm summers and cool winters with light snowfall.  The average annual temperature in Higashimiyoshi is 13.0 °C. The average annual rainfall is 2104 mm with September as the wettest month. The temperatures are highest on average in August, at around 24.3 °C, and lowest in January, at around 1.8 °C.

Demographics
Per Japanese census data, the population of Higashimiyoshi has been declining gradually since the 1950s.

History 
As with all of Tokushima Prefecture, the area of Higashimiyoshi was part of ancient Awa Province. Miyoshi District is mentioned in  Heian period records, and from the Muromachi period,  was the home territory of the Miyoshi clan. During the Edo period, the area was part of the holdings of Tokushima Domain ruled by the Hachisuka clan from their seat at Tokushima Castle. The village of Hiruma (昼間町) was established within Miyoshi District with the creation of the modern municipalities system on October 1, 1889. It was raised to town status on October 1, 1925. After merging with the village of Ashiru on March 21, 1955, it became the town of Miyoshi. On March 1, 2006 Miyoshi merged with the town of  Mikamo to form the town of Higashimiyoshi.

Government
Higashimiyoshi has a mayor-council form of government with a directly elected mayor and a unicameral town council of 14 members. Higashimiyoshi, together with the other municipalities of Miyoshi District, contributes one member to the Tokushima Prefectural Assembly. In terms of national politics, the town is part of Tokushima 2nd district of the lower house of the Diet of Japan.

Economy
Higashimiyoshi has an economy based on agriculture and forestry.

Education
Higashimiyoshi has four public elementary schools and two public middle schools operated by the town government. The town does not have a high school.

Transportation

Railway
 JR Shikoku - Tokushima Line
 -  -

Highways 
  Tokushima Expressway

Local attractions
Asan Circuit race course
Tanda Kofun, National Historic Site
Hashikura Prefectural Natural Park

Notable people from Higashimiyoshi
Kazuo Taoka, former yakuza godfather

References

External links 

  

Towns in Tokushima Prefecture